The following lists events that happened in 2001 in Iceland.

Incumbents
President – Ólafur Ragnar Grímsson 
Prime Minister – Davíð Oddsson

Events

June
8 June - Iceland applies to rejoin the IWC, granted observer status.

 
2000s in Iceland
Iceland
Iceland
Years of the 21st century in Iceland